Xiushui County is a county in the northwest of Jiangxi Province, China, bordering the provinces of Hunan to the west and southwest and Hubei to the northwest. It is the westernmost county-level division of the prefecture-level city of Jiujiang.

Xiushui is the largest county in Jiangxi Province and the most populous county in Jiujiang City. It is a sub-central city of Jiujiang City [1]. In 2019, Xiushui County achieved a gross regional product (GDP) of 24.7 billion yuan throughout the year

Xiushui has a long history. It was named Aihou in the Shang Dynasty and Aiyi in the Spring and Autumn Period. It was under the jurisdiction of Wu, Chu and Yue successively. Jian'ai County in Han Dynasty was merged into Jianchang County in Sui Dynasty and Wuning County in Tang Dynasty. In 800 years (in the first year of Dezong in Tang Dynasty), Xiba Township of Wuning County was built in Fenning County. Yangyang County. It was promoted to Ningzhou in the Yuan Dynasty and was changed to Ningzhou in 1801 (the sixth year of Jiaqing in the Qing Dynasty). In 1912 (the first year of the Republic of China), the name was changed to Ning County, and in 1914, it was renamed Xiushui County, which was named after Xiuhe river within the territory.

Administrative divisions
Xiushui County has 19 towns and 17 townships.

19 towns

17 townships

Climate

References

External links

 
County-level divisions of Jiangxi
Jiujiang